Walter E. Meanwell (26 January 1884 – 2 December 1953) was an English college men's basketball coach in the 1910s, 1920s and 1930s. The Leeds, England native coached in the U.S. for the University of Wisconsin–Madison (1911–1917, 1920–1934) and the University of Missouri (1918–1920) to an overall record of 290–101.

Meanwell became the fourth basketball coach in University of Wisconsin–Madison history in 1911. After earning a doctorate degree in 1915, he was nicknamed "Doc" or "Little Doc" (due to his 5'6" frame). During World War I era, he served in the United States Army Medical Corps and became a captain. After a two-year stint at University of Missouri, Meanwell was back at Wisconsin. The Badgers won or shared four Big Ten titles under his guidance (1921, 1923–24, 1929). His 1912, 1914, and 1916 Wisconsin teams were retroactively named national champions by the Helms Athletic Foundation and the Premo-Porretta Power Poll. Meanwell taught a style of game that featured short passing, crisscross dribbles and a tight zone defense. In 1934 he retired from coaching and practiced medicine in Madison, Wisconsin, until his death. He was inducted to the Naismith Memorial Basketball Hall of Fame as a coach in 1959.

Head coaching record

References

External links
 
 
 

1884 births
1953 deaths
British emigrants to the United States
English basketball coaches
Missouri Tigers athletic directors
Missouri Tigers men's basketball coaches
Naismith Memorial Basketball Hall of Fame inductees
National Collegiate Basketball Hall of Fame inductees
Sportspeople from Leeds
United States Army officers
University of Missouri faculty
Wisconsin Badgers athletic directors
Wisconsin Badgers men's basketball coaches